Hagen's flying squirrel (Petinomys hageni) is a species of rodent in the family Sciuridae. It is endemic to Indonesia.

References

Thorington, R. W. Jr. and R. S. Hoffman. 2005. Family Sciuridae. pp. 754–818 in Mammal Species of the World a Taxonomic and Geographic Reference. D. E. Wilson and D. M. Reeder eds. Johns Hopkins University Press, Baltimore.

Petinomys
Mammals of Indonesia
Mammals described in 1888
Taxonomy articles created by Polbot